Rebecca Lynn Hamilton (born July 12, 1990) is an American curler from McFarland, Wisconsin. She is a two-time national women's champion, a two-time national junior champion, and a two-time Olympian. At the 2018 PyeongChang Olympics, she competed in mixed doubles curling with her brother, Matt, along with playing with the women's curling team. She was again on the women's curling team during the 2022 Beijing Olympics.

Career
Hamilton's junior career involved participating in five straight national junior championships from 2008 to 2012. She won the event in both 2008 and 2011. In 2008, Hamilton played third for the Nina Spatola junior team, which finished with a 1–6 (8th) record at the 2008 World Junior Curling Championships. In 2011, Hamilton skipped the team of Tara Peterson, Karlie Koenig and Sophie Brorson to a 5–5 (5th) record at the 2011 World Junior Curling Championships.

Hamilton has also played in eight national championships. At the 2010 United States Women's Curling Championship, Hamilton skipped a team of Koenig, Jenna Haag, and Grace Gabower to a 7–2 round robin finish in a four-way tie for first. However, the team would lose in their first playoff game against Patti Lank. However, Hamilton's trip to the 2012 United States Women's Curling Championship would be less successful. She skipped a team of Peterson, Koenig, and Brorson to a 4–5 record and missed the playoffs. At the 2013 United States Women's Curling Championship, Hamilton led her rink of Molly Bonner, Peterson, and Brorson to a 3–6 finish, again missing the playoffs.

In 2013, she joined up with her junior skip, Nina Spatola, throwing third stones for the team.
The team won the 2014 United States Women's Curling Championship. The following season, Hamilton was moved to second on the team. The team had less success at the 2015 United States Women's Curling Championship, finishing with a 4–5 record.

In 2015, Hamilton joined the Jamie Sinclair rink as her second. At the 2016 United States Women's Curling Championship, they would finish in fourth place. She would only play with Sinclair for one season before returning to the Spatola (now Roth) rink, throwing lead rocks. The team was runners-up at the 2017 US Championships but represented the United States at the 2017 World Women's Curling Championship, finishing in sixth place.

At the 2018 Winter Olympics, Hamilton placed sixth in the mixed doubles competition and eighth in the team competition.

At the 2020 United States Women's Championship, Hamilton earned her second national title, as third for Tabitha Peterson. In the round robin, Team Peterson's only loss came against Jamie Sinclair, but they then beat Team Sinclair in the 1 vs. 2 page playoff game and again in the final.  As United States Champions Team Peterson would have represented the United States at the 2020 World Women's Curling Championship, but they lost that opportunity when the Championship was cancelled due to the COVID-19 pandemic. They also earned a spot at the final Grand Slam of the season, the Champions Cup, which was also cancelled due to the pandemic. Their qualification will instead carry over to the 2021 Champions Cup.

During the 2020 off-season, the team announced that Tabitha Peterson would remain as skip when Roth returned from maternity leave. Roth re-joined the team as vice-skip at third, with Hamilton moving to second, Tara Peterson to lead, and Geving to alternate. Due to the COVID-19 pandemic, the Peterson team did not compete in events for most of the 2020–21 season until entering a bio-secure bubble held in Calgary, Alberta in the spring of 2021 for three events in a row. The first two events were the Champions Cup and Players' Championship grand slams, with the team missing the playoffs at both. The third event in the Calgary bubble for Team Peterson was the 2021 World Women's Championship, in which they earned a spot as 2020 National Champions after the 2021 National Championship was moved to later in the spring due to the pandemic. They finished the 13-game round-robin in fifth place with a 7–6 record, earning them a spot in the playoffs and securing a 2022 Olympic berth for the United States. In the playoffs, Team Peterson defeated Denmark's Madeline Dupont but lost to Switzerland's Silvana Tirinzoni to end up in the bronze medal game. There, Peterson faced off against Sweden's Anna Hasselborg and won with a score of 9–5, including scoring five points in the seventh end. Team Peterson's bronze medal finish was the first World Women's medal for the United States in 15 years, and the first-ever bronze medal.

The Peterson rink won their first two events of the 2021–22 season, the US Open of Curling and the 2021 Curlers Corner Autumn Gold Curling Classic. The following week, they played in the 2021 Masters where they made it as far as the quarterfinals. The team then played in the 2021 United States Olympic Curling Trials, where they attempted to return to the Olympics. Through the round robin, the team posted a 9–1 record, putting them into the best-of-three final against Cory Christensen. The Peterson rink beat Christensen in two-straight games, booking their tickets to the 2022 Winter Olympics. After the Trials, the team played in one event before the Olympics, the Curl Mesabi Classic, which they won, beating Christensen again in the final. At the Olympics, the team finished the round robin with a 4–5 record, missing the playoffs. The team finished off the season by playing in two Slams, the 2022 Players' Championship and the 2022 Champions Cup, missing the playoffs in both events. In mixed doubles that season, she and her brother Matt Hamilton played in the 2021 United States mixed doubles curling Olympic trials, where they posted a 5–4 round robin record. This put them in a tiebreaker, which they lost, eliminating them from contention. The pair later competed in the 2022 United States Mixed Doubles Curling Championship, where they went undefeated to secure the national title. At the 2022 World Mixed Doubles Curling Championship, they finished fourth in their pool with a 5–4 record, not enough to advance to the playoff round.

Personal life
Her brother Matt Hamilton is also a successful curler, having played on the 2018 United States Olympic men's team. Matt and Becca also competed together in mixed doubles at the 2018 Winter Olympics. As of 2021, she is a student. She attended Edgewood College.

Teams

Women's

Mixed doubles

References

External links

Becca Hamilton on the United States Curling Association database

1990 births
Living people
People from McFarland, Wisconsin
American female curlers
Sportspeople from Madison, Wisconsin
Continental Cup of Curling participants
Curlers at the 2018 Winter Olympics
Olympic curlers of the United States
Edgewood College alumni
American curling champions
21st-century American women
Curlers at the 2022 Winter Olympics